Pauline Thornhill is a Canadian television host and producer of Canadian Broadcasting Corporation's longest running regional television program, Land and Sea on CBC owned-and-operated station CBNT-DT. She served in this capacity from 1993 to 2022. Thornhill grew up in Bay L'Argent. She graduated in 1986 from the journalism program at the University of King's College. Thornhill started work as a journalist with CBC Television in St. John's, Newfoundland and Labrador on the news program Here & Now. She became host and producer of CBC's Land and Sea in 1993. Thornhill received the 2004 Gracie Allen Award for the Land and Sea program "Built from Scratch",  a story of the woman  and her bakery.

References

Living people
Canadian Broadcasting Corporation people
Canadian television producers
Canadian women television producers
Canadian television hosts
Canadian women television hosts
People from St. John's, Newfoundland and Labrador
University of King's College alumni
Year of birth missing (living people)
Date of birth missing (living people)